Chalcosyrphus fortis is a species of hoverfly in the family Syrphidae.

Distribution
C.fortis is found in China.

References

Eristalinae
Insects described in 1995
Diptera of Asia